Levan Moseshvili (23 May 1940 – 5 March 2020) was a Georgian basketball player. Playing for the Soviet team he won a silver medal at the 1964 Summer Olympics. Between 1972 and 1998 he was the head coach of Dynamo Tbilisi and after that headed the Georgian team.

References

1940 births
2020 deaths
Basketball players from Tbilisi
Men's basketball players from Georgia (country)
Soviet men's basketball players
BC Dinamo Tbilisi players
Olympic basketball players of the Soviet Union
Basketball players at the 1964 Summer Olympics
Olympic silver medalists for the Soviet Union
Olympic medalists in basketball
Medalists at the 1964 Summer Olympics